Boondall State School is an independent public primary school located in Brisbane, Queensland, in the suburb of Boondall. It is operated by the Queensland Government. Today it has 680 primary students from prep to grade 6.

History 

Boondall State School was opened on 6 April 1925 with an enrolment of 61 students. 

Long serving principal, Chris Campanaris, retired after 22 years at the end of 2013 and was succeeded by Kim McNamara.  McNamara moved schools in the middle of 2016 to West End State School and was succeeded by the permanent appointment of Angelique Padgett at the beginning of 2017. Sharni Tomkins was appointed as principal to begin the 2020 school year.

Location 
The school is located on the corner of Sandgate and Roscommon Roads in northside Brisbane suburb of Boondall. The main entrance to the school is via Roscommon Road.

References

External links

 

Educational institutions established in 1925
Public primary schools in Brisbane
Boondall, Queensland
1925 establishments in Australia